Richard Deacon (26 June 1911 - 1986) was a Scottish-born footballer who played as an inside left for a number of clubs in the Football League during the 1930s.

Career
Deacon joined Second Division Wolverhampton Wanderers from Cockfield in 1929, along with his older brother Jimmy. His other brother John signed for Liverpool from Redcar Borough.

While his brother made over 150 appearances for Wolves, Dickie struggled to make any impact and managed just three first team games. He made his league debut on 7 March 1931 in a 0-1 defeat at Bury and played the following game, at home to Port Vale, where he scored in a 3-0 victory. His only other appearance for the club came the following month, a 1-1 draw with Bradford Park Avenue.

He joined West Ham United, but again only played three times for their first team, during the 1932-33 season. His brother John joined him at West Ham in 1934. He soon moved to fellow London side Chelsea, where he also served as trainer after retiring from playing.

He finished his playing career with spells at Glenavon, Northampton Town and Lincoln City, and also guested for Northampton during wartime.

References

 

1911 births
1986 deaths
Association football inside forwards
Footballers from Glasgow
English Football League players
Cockfield F.C. players
Darlington F.C. players
Wolverhampton Wanderers F.C. players
West Ham United F.C. players
Chelsea F.C. players
Glenavon F.C. players
Northampton Town F.C. players
Lincoln City F.C. players
Scottish footballers
Chelsea F.C. non-playing staff